Varaždin Hydroelectric Power Plant is a hydroelectric power plant on river Drava, near the city of Varaždin located in Varaždin County, in the northwest part of Croatia.

The Varaždin Hydroelectric Power Plant is a multipurpose hydroelectric plant harnessing the Drava River water power on a 28.5 km long stretch, providing flood and erosion control for the land and settlements, enabling water supply, draining excessive soil moisture content and offering the possibilities for gravity drainage of the valley and gravity land irrigation. Installed power at generator terminals is 86 MW, and possible average annual output is 476 GWh.

See also

Hrvatska elektroprivreda

Hydroelectric power stations in Croatia
Hydroelectric Power Plant